Willy Bürki (4 July 1909 – 15 February 1979) was a Swiss wrestler. He competed in the men's freestyle heavyweight at the 1936 Summer Olympics.

References

External links
 

1909 births
1979 deaths
Swiss male sport wrestlers
Olympic wrestlers of Switzerland
Wrestlers at the 1936 Summer Olympics
Sportspeople from Bern
20th-century Swiss people